Mount A is the debut album from Icelandic musician Hildur Guðnadóttir. The album features a dark, somewhat repetitive soundscape built upon cello, gamba, khuur, piano, zither, vibraphone and gamelan all of which are played by Hildur. Recording sessions took place both in New York City and in a house in Hólar specifically chosen for its good cello acoustics.

Track listing
 "Light" - 4:18
 "Floods" - 3:29
 "Casting" - 6:35
 "Shadowed" - 2:22
 "Self" - 6:37
 "Growth" - 3:36
 "In Gray" - 3:23
 "My" - 2:37
 "Reflection" - 7:31
 "Earbraces" - 3:28
 "You" - 10:07

References

2006 debut albums
Hildur Guðnadóttir albums